Senator Pemberton may refer to:

Dewayne Pemberton (born 1956), Oklahoma State Senate
Stanton C. Pemberton (1858–1944), Illinois State Senate